Serbian Voivodeship may refer to:
Serbian Vojvodina
Voivodeship of Serbia and Banat of Temeschwar